Lapin kullan kimallus (Finnish for The glitter of Lappish gold) is a 1999 Finnish movie, directed by Åke Lindman.

The movie is about the Lapland gold rush in the end of the 19th century. It stars Pirkka-Pekka Petelius as Nils Lepistö and Vesa Vierikko as Jakob Ervasti.

Plot summary

In his hometown Oulu, Lepistö meets a man who shows him a map of Lapland, showing an "X" mark at the spot where he claims is gold. Lepistö believes the man and shows the map to his companion Ervasti. Lepistö and Ervasti travel to the Teno River, where they manage to find two kilograms of gold. They travel back to Oulu to lay official claim on the find site but are told it has already been claimed. Finally a large gold rush to Lapland starts.

Notes
Despite the name, the movie has nothing to do with the Finnish brand of beer named Lapin Kulta (Gold of Lapland).

External links
 

1999 films
1990s Finnish-language films
Films directed by Åke Lindman
1999 drama films
Finnish drama films